Unarchigal is a 1976 Indian Tamil-language film co-written and directed by R. C. Sakthi in his directorial debut. The film stars Kamal Haasan and Srividya. It is a highly sensuous film which deals with sexually transmitted diseases, and subsequently the film ran into trouble with the censor board, prompting a delay in its release. The film was remade in Malayalam as Raasaleela and released in 1975, before the original had come out.

Plot 

Muthu is an 18-year-old simpleton who works in a small village. He is sexually harassed by his landlord's sister, a widow. Unable to bear it any longer, Muthu goes to Madras. However, he is again harassed in a similar way by people whom he meets. He finds work at a hotel as a room boy where he meets Maragadham, a prostitute. He then rescues her once from a raid. After he saves her, she develops a soft spot towards him. He lives in Maragadham's house as a servant but later is thrown away from her home. In the end Muthu gets affected by an STD and is shown in a hospital being treated by a doctor and eventually dies.

Cast 
 Kamal Haasan as Muthu
 L. Kanchana as Kamala
 Srividya as Maragadham
 Major Sundarrajan as Doctor
 Lalithasree as a prostitute
 S. V. Ramadas  as Bhoopathy
 V. Gopalakrishnan as Balu
 K. K. Soundar as Police Inspector
 Vellai Subbaiah as Subbiah

Production 
The story was written by R. C. Sakthi and Kamal Haasan. Additionally, Haasan worked as assistant director also. The film was initially supposed to be Haasan's first film as a lead actor after being launched in 1972, however delays meant that the film was only released 4 years later. The same film was later remade in Malayalam as Raasaleela and released in 1975, before the original had come out.

Soundtrack 
All Songs are written by Kannadasan, Pattukottai Dhandayuthapani, Velavendhan, Muthulingam.

Reception
Kanthan of Kalki praised the performances of cast, called Sakthi's dialogues as thought provoking but felt the story died in the beginning itself. The critic also felt Raasaleela did not have any disease and questioned for adding this change in Tamil and concluded did makers thought that Tamil audience lack emotions.

References

External links 
 

1970s Tamil-language films
1976 films
Films about sexually transmitted diseases
Films directed by R. C. Sakthi
Tamil films remade in other languages